Robert L. "Bob" Ellingson (born September 3, 1950) is an American lawyer and politician.

Born in Minneapolis, Minnesota, Ellingson graduated from Brooklyn Center High School in 1967. In 1971, he received his bachelor's degree in government and international relations from Carleton College. In 1986, Ellingson received his master's degree from the John F. Kennedy School of Government at Harvard University. In 1975, Ellingson received his Juris Doctor degree from the University of Minnesota Law School and then practiced law in Brooklyn Center, Minnesota. From 1977 to 1987, Ellingson served in the Minnesota House of Representatives and was a Democrat. Ellingson served on the Hennepin County, Minnesota Parks Board from 1987 to 1990. He also served on the Minnetonka, Minnesota city council from 2004 to 2020.

Notes

1950 births
Living people
Politicians from Minneapolis
People from Minnetonka, Minnesota
Carleton College alumni
Harvard Kennedy School alumni
University of Minnesota Law School alumni
Minnesota lawyers
County commissioners in Minnesota
Minnesota city council members
Democratic Party members of the Minnesota House of Representatives
Lawyers from Minneapolis
People from Brooklyn Center, Minnesota